Dendroterus is a genus of typical bark beetles in the family Curculionidae. There are about 17 described species in Dendroterus.

Species
These 17 species belong to the genus Dendroterus:

 Dendroterus cognatus Wood, 1971
 Dendroterus confinis Wood, 1959b
 Dendroterus decipiens Wood, 1959b
 Dendroterus defectus Wood, 1971
 Dendroterus eximius Wood, 1971
 Dendroterus fossifrons Wood
 Dendroterus luteolus Wood & Bright, 1992
 Dendroterus mexicanus Blandford, 1904
 Dendroterus modicus Wood
 Dendroterus mundus Wood, 1959b
 Dendroterus parilis Wood, 1971
 Dendroterus perspectus Wood, 1959b
 Dendroterus resolutus Wood, 1971
 Dendroterus sallaei Blandford, 1904
 Dendroterus sodalis Wood, 1971
 Dendroterus striatus (LeConte, 1868)
 Dendroterus texanus Wood, 1959

References

Further reading

 
 
 

Scolytinae
Articles created by Qbugbot